Christian Georges Cévaër (born 10 April 1970) is a French professional golfer.

Amateur career 
Cévaër was born in Noumea, New Caledonia. He attended the Stevenson School in Pebble Beach, California. He then earned a golf scholarship to Stanford University. He won the Pac-10 Championship twice. He also won the 1989 French Amateur Championship.

Professional career 
Cévaër turned professional in 1993. He has spent most of his professional career playing on the European Tour. Inconsistent form has necessitated several trips to the European Tour Qualifying School. Due to his inconsistent play he has also been forced to play on the developmental Challenge Tour. He has two European Tour titles, the 2004 Canarias Open de España and the European Open in 2009. In addition, he has two Challenge Tour victories, the 1998 Volvo Finnish Open and the 2000 Finnish Masters.

His best year-end ranking on the Order of Merit has been 41st in 2004.

Amateur wins
1987 Doug Sanders World Junior Championship
1988 British Youths Open Amateur Championship
1989 French Amateur Championship, PAC-10 Championship
1992 PAC-10 Championship

Professional wins (7)

European Tour wins (2)

Challenge Tour wins (3)

Other wins (2)
1993 Mediterranean Games
2000 MGT de Barbaroux

Results in major championships

Note: Cévaër never played in the Masters Tournament or the PGA Championship.

CUT = missed the half-way cut
"T" = tied

Results in World Golf Championships

"T" = Tied

Team appearances
Amateur
European Boys' Team Championship (representing France): 1988 (winners)
Eisenhower Trophy (representing France): 1988, 1990, 1992
European Amateur Team Championship (representing France): 1989, 1991, 1993
Professional
World Cup (representing France): 2009

References

External links
 

French male golfers
New Caledonian male golfers
Stanford Cardinal men's golfers
European Tour golfers
Mediterranean Games medalists in golf
Mediterranean Games gold medalists for France
Mediterranean Games silver medalists for France
Competitors at the 1991 Mediterranean Games
Competitors at the 1993 Mediterranean Games
People from Nouméa
People from Pebble Beach, California
1970 births
Living people